Saiga (written: 斎賀, 齋賀 or 雑賀) is a Japanese surname. Notable people with the surname include:

, Japanese diplomat
, Japanese voice actress and singer
, Japanese photographer

Japanese-language surnames